KIXT (106.7 FM, "The Eagle") is a radio station broadcasting a classic rock format. Licensed to Hewitt, Texas, United States, the station serves the Waco metropolitan area. The station is owned by Prophecy Media Group, LLC.  Its studios are located in Waco, and its transmitter is located north of Bruceville-Eddy, Texas.

History
The station signed on in 2010 as variety hits "Doc FM" KDRW (a nod to Waco being the birthplace of Dr Pepper).   It switched to country music "Kix 106.7" KIXT in February 2012. The country format was relaunched as "106-7 The Bull" in 2014.

Another relaunch of the station happened on April 3, 2017 as a classic rock station called "The Eagle."

References

External links

IXT
Classic rock radio stations in the United States